Gallagher v. Crown Kosher Super Market of Massachusetts, Inc., 366 U.S. 617 (1961), is a United States Supreme Court case that declared that a kosher butcher store had to abide by the state laws that banned them from selling on Sunday.

Background
The owners of the Crown Kosher Super Market of Massachusetts were Orthodox Jews whose religion forbids them to shop or sell from sundown on Friday until sundown on Saturday and requires them to eat only kosher food, were keeping their store open on Sunday at times when it was against the Massachusetts state law.

The lawsuit was in a Federal District Court to make certain sections of the Massachusetts Sunday Closing Laws unconstitutional. Specifically, "the selling or delivering of kosher meat by any person who, according to his religious belief, observes Saturday as the Lord's day by closing his place of business during the day until six o'clock in the afternoon, or the keeping open of his shop on the Lord's day for the sale of kosher meat between the hours of six o'clock and ten o'clock in the forenoon."

The store had formerly been open for business all day on Sundays and had done about a third of its weekly business then. It was closed from sundown on Fridays until sundown on Saturdays. The store had claimed that it was economically impractical for it to keep open on Saturday nights and until 10 a.m. on Sundays. Many who bought at the store would not have been able to get meat from Friday afternoon until Monday.

Counsel of Record

ACLU Side: Herbert B. Ehrmann, with Samuel L. Fein on the brief.

Opposing Side: Joseph H. Elcock, Jr., Asst. Attorney General of Massachusetts. With him on the brief were Edward J. McCormack, Jr., John Warren McGarry, Arthur E. Sutherland, Jr., and S. Thomas Martinelli.

Opinion of the Court
The court 6-3 approved the state law, due to the laws not being exclusively religious.
"An examination of recent Massachusetts legislative history bolsters the State's position that these statutes are not religious.

"In general, Sunday laws protect the public by guaranteeing one day in seven to provide a period of rest and quiet. Health, peace and good order of society are thereby promoted. Such provision is essentially civil in character, and the statutes are not regarded as religious ordinances."

Also on the issue of free exercise of religion they stated: "Secondly, appellees Orthodox Jewish customers allege that, because their religious beliefs forbid their shopping on the Jewish Sabbath, the statutes' effect is to deprive them, from Friday afternoon until Monday of each week, of the opportunity to purchase the kosher food sanctioned by their faith. The orthodox rabbis allege that the statutes' effect greatly complicates their task of supervising the condition of kosher meat, because the meat delivered on Friday would have to be kept until Monday. Furthermore, appellees contend that, because of all this, the statutes discriminate against their religion.

These allegations are similar, although not as grave, as those made by appellants in Braunfeld v. Brown, ante, p. 366 U.S. 599. Since the decision in that case rejects the contentions presented by these appellees on the merits, we need not decide whether appellees have standing to raise these questions."

Justices William O. Douglas, William J. Brennan, Jr. and Potter Stewart dissented from the opinion.

Subsequent developments
This was one of the four cases decided in 1961 that declared "Sunday closing" blue laws to be constitutional. The other three were Braunfeld v. Brown, Two Guys from Harrison-Allentown, Inc., v. McGinley and McGowan v. Maryland.

In the 1977 case Trans World Airlines, Inc. v. Hardison, the court held that firing an employee who observed a seventh-day sabbath did not constitute religious discrimination as prohibited by

See also 
 McGowan v. Maryland: another blue law court case
 List of United States Supreme Court cases, volume 366

References

External links
 
 See Gallager v. Crown Kosher Super Market Case summary at ProCon.org

1961 in United States case law
United States free exercise of religion case law
United States Supreme Court cases
1961 in religion
Working time
Sunday shopping
History of Springfield, Massachusetts
Jewish-American history
Kosher meat
United States Supreme Court cases of the Warren Court